The 17th Annual Gotham Independent Film Awards, presented by the Independent Filmmaker Project, were held on November 27, 2007, and were hosted by Sarah Jones. The nominees were announced on October 22, 2007.

Winners and nominees

Gotham Tributes
 Javier Bardem
 Michael Bloomberg
 Roger Ebert
 Mark Friedberg 
 Mira Nair
 Jonathan Sehring

Notes

References

External links
 

2007
2007 film awards